Changchun University is a multi-disciplinary university in Changchun, Jilin. It includes three campuses all together covering 1,129,000 squaremeters. Established in 1946, Changchun University has trained more than 40,000 undergraduate students.

The university consists of 17 institutions, offers 46 undergraduate degree courses, and represents over 13,000 students. There are over 707 instructors in the university, including 110 professors and 318 associate professors. At present, Changchun University has three national-level science research centers, one provincial key academic discipline, one provincial key science lab, and two provincial key humanities and social sciences research bases.

The university's education scope covers philosophy, economics, law, education, literature, history, science, engineering, agriculture, medicine, and management.

External links

Universities and colleges in Jilin